Planetetherium is an extinct genus of herbivorous gliding mammal endemic to North America during the Paleogene living from 56.8 to 55.4 mya, existing for approximately .

Fossils have been discovered in strata formed from ancient cypress forests, suggesting that this was the animal's preferred habitat.

Morphology
Its teeth already included the comb-like structure distinctive to modern colugos. There is no direct evidence that Planetetherium had the membrane of skin that allows modern colugos to glide, but its bodily proportions suggests that this was likely the case.

References

Prehistoric placental genera
Paleocene mammals
Paleocene mammals of North America
Fossil taxa described in 1928